The Damascus Sanjak was a prefecture (sanjak) of the Ottoman Empire, occupying the center of Ottoman Syria, located in modern-day Syria and Lebanon. The city of Damascus was the Sanjak's capital. It was bordered by the Sanjak of Hauran to the south, Hama Sanjak to the north, and Beirut Vilayet to the west.

Subdistricts 
 Damascus Sanjak had the following nahiyahs: Damascus, Baalbek, Beqaa, Douma, Hasbaya, Rashaya, Wadi al-Ajam (Qatana) and Zabadani.

Later history
When dividing Ottoman Syria, the French mandate authorities detached the westernmost part of the sanjak and allocated it to its newly created Greater Lebanon, while the rest remained in the shriveled Syrian state.

References

States and territories established in 1549
1549 establishments in the Ottoman Empire
1918 disestablishments in the Ottoman Empire
Sanjaks of Ottoman Syria
History of Damascus
History of Syria
History of Lebanon